Walters Lake is a 77-acre, 21-feet deep lake.

The lake lies within Independence Township in Oakland County, Michigan.

Walters Lake is north and east of Clarkston Road, and north of Clintonville Road.

Walters Lake connects upstream with Heather Lake.

Fish
Walters Lake fish include Largemouth Bass, Bluegill and Perch.

References

Lakes of Oakland County, Michigan
Lakes of Michigan
Lakes of Independence Township, Michigan